is a passenger railway station located in the city of Maibara, Shiga Prefecture, Japan, operated by the Central Japan Railway Company (JR Tōkai).

Lines

Station layout
The station consists of one side platform and one island platform connected by a footbridge; however, only one side of the island platform is in use. The station is staffed.

Platforms

Adjacent stations

History
Samegai Station opened on 21 February 1900 on the Japanese Government Railway (JGR) Tōkaidō Line.  The station came under the aegis of the Central Japan Railway Company on April 1, 1987 due to the privatization of JNR. 

Station numbering was introduced to the section of the Tōkaidō Line operated by JR Central in March 2018; Samegai Station was assigned station number CA82.

Passenger statistics
In fiscal 2019, the station was used by an average of 358 passengers daily (boarding passengers only).

Surrounding area
Maibara City Samegai Administrative Service Center
Samegai-juku Museum

See also
List of railway stations in Japan

References

Yoshikawa, Fumio. Tokaido-sen 130-nen no ayumi. Grand-Prix Publishing (2002) .

External links

Railway stations in Japan opened in 1900
Railway stations in Mie Prefecture
Tōkaidō Main Line
Stations of Central Japan Railway Company
Maibara, Shiga